Saschiz (Transylvanian Saxon: Keist) is a commune in Mureș County, Transylvania, central Romania. It has a population of 2,048: 88 percent Romanians, 5 percent Germans (more specifically Transylvanian Saxons), 4 percent Hungarians, and 3 percent Roma. It is composed of three villages, namely: Cloașterf, Mihai Viteazu (Zoltan until 1932), and Saschiz.

Saschiz, with its 15th-century church, is part of the World Heritage Site Villages with fortified churches in Transylvania, designated in 1999 by UNESCO.

Natives
Ion Dacian (1911–1981), light opera singer
Dan-Alexandru Voiculescu (1940–2009), composer

Gallery

See also 
 Transylvanian Saxons
 Villages with fortified churches in Transylvania

References

Communes in Mureș County
Localities in Transylvania
Villages with fortified churches in Transylvania